Full Circle is the fourth studio album by the American punk rock band Pennywise. It was released on April 22, 1997 (see 1997 in music) and was digitally remastered on March 8, 2005 on the original label. This is the first Pennywise studio album to feature Randy Bradbury, who replaced bassist Jason Thirsk, who had died from suicide on July 29, 1996. The entire album was dedicated to the memory of Thirsk, who had been a key songwriter for Pennywise until his death, and a close friend of all of those in the band.

Writing and production
There had been a delay between 1995's About Time and the recording of this album, which occurred in the fall of 1996. During the About Time tour, founding member Jason Thirsk took a hiatus from Pennywise to try to control his then-growing alcoholism. One Hit Wonder bassist Randy Bradbury, who had contributed on the band's 1993 album Unknown Road, stepped in. When Thirsk returned briefly on bass in 1996, Bradbury was supposed to switch to rhythm guitar; unfortunately, Thirsk died of a self-inflicted gunshot wound on July 29 of that year at the age of 28. His death nearly delayed the production of the fourth Pennywise album.

Pennywise was shaken by Thirsk's death; however, they decided to continue performing, thus adding Bradbury as Thirsk's permanent replacement. The band finally returned to the studio in the fall of 1996 to begin recording the follow-up to About Time.

Reception

NME listed the album as one of "20 Pop Punk Albums Which Will Make You Nostalgic".

Track listing

 After a period of silence, a hidden track with a piano solo is played. The solo is an extension of the original piano composition that marks the beginning of Pennywise's second album Unknown Road (1993). Track 14, including the period of silence and the hidden track, totals 23:56.

All songs by Pennywise.

Personnel
Jim Lindberg : vocals
Fletcher Dragge : guitar
Randy Bradbury : bass
Byron McMackin : drums
Eddie Ashworth : producer, engineer, mixing
Milton Chan : mixing
Fred Hidalgo : logo
Jesse Fischer : artwork
Brett Gurewitz : mixing
Pennywise : producer, engineer, artwork, mixing
Darian Rundall : assistant engineer, mixing
Eddy Schreyer : mastering
Justin Thirsk : backing vocals
Ronnie King : piano on "Unknown Road"

Charts

Certifications

References

External links

Full Circle at YouTube (streamed copy where licensed)

1997 albums
Pennywise (band) albums
Epitaph Records albums
Albums produced by Eddie Ashworth